Jane Janevski (born 1 January 1920) is a Macedonian football manager and former player.

Playing career
Janevski played with FK Partizan immediately after the end of Second World War. With Partizan he played a total of 36 games and scored 28 goals, of which 7 games and 1 goal were in the 1946–47 Yugoslav First League, the only season he played in Belgrade. Then he moved to FK Vardar where he will play in Yugoslav First and Second leagues between 1947 and 1955 making a total of 120 league appearances and 27 goals. He played a total with Vardar of 242 games and scored over 100 goals, he was among the first team captains, and was chosen as the Macedonian player of the year. Besides captain and prolific goalscorer, he was also at Vardar the coach of the youth team, having won Yugoslav youth championship in 1949. By 2016, he is considered by the FK Vardar official website as one of the club legends.

Managerial career
Afterwards, he coached Turkish side Beşiktaş in 1967–68. Then he coached Greek side PAOK FC.

Honors
As player:

Partizan
Yugoslav First League: 1946–47

Vardar
Yugoslav Second League: 1951

As coach
Vardar
Yugoslav youth championship: 1948–49

References

1920 births
Possibly living people
Yugoslav footballers
Macedonian footballers
Association football forwards
FK Partizan players
FK Vardar players
Yugoslav First League players
Macedonian football managers
Yugoslav football managers
Beşiktaş J.K. managers
PAOK FC managers
Pierikos F.C. managers
Kavala F.C. managers
Yugoslav expatriate football managers
Macedonian expatriate football managers
Expatriate football managers in Turkey
Macedonian expatriate sportspeople in Turkey
Yugoslav expatriate sportspeople in Turkey
Expatriate football managers in Greece
Macedonian expatriate sportspeople in Greece